Jimmy Connor may refer to:

Jimmy Connor (footballer, born 1881), Scottish association football defender who played for Blackpool
Jimmy Connor (footballer, born 1909) (1909–1980), association football winger who played for Sunderland and Scotland
Jimmy Connor (footballer, born 1938), English association football winger who played for Darlington

See also
James Connor (disambiguation)
Jimmy Connors (born 1952), tennis player
Jimmy O'Connor, footballer
Jimmy O'Connor (author) (1918–2001), television playwright